E. Pugazhendi is an Indian politician and former Member of the Legislative Assembly of Tamil Nadu. He was elected to the Tamil Nadu legislative assembly as a Dravida Munnetra Kazhagam candidate from Cuddalore constituency in 1989, 1996 and 2001 elections. His father Ere. Elamvazhuthi was also a DMK politician.

References 

Dravida Munnetra Kazhagam politicians
Living people
Tamil Nadu MLAs 1996–2001
Tamil Nadu MLAs 2001–2006
Year of birth missing (living people)